The list of postcode areas in the United Kingdom is a tabulation of the postcode areas used by Royal Mail for the purposes of directing mail within the United Kingdom. The postcode area is the largest geographical unit used and forms the initial characters of the alphanumeric UK postcode. There are currently 121 geographic postcode areas in use in the UK and a further three often combined with these covering the Crown Dependencies of Guernsey, Jersey and Isle of Man.

Subdivision
Each postcode area is further divided into post towns and postcode districts. There are on average 20 postcode districts to a postcode area. The London post town is instead divided into several postcode areas.

Scope
The single or pair of letters chosen for postcode areas are generally intended as a mnemonic for the places served. Postcode areas, post towns and postcode districts do not follow political boundaries and usually serve much larger areas than the place names with which they are associated. For example, within the PA postcode area the PA1 and PA78 postcode districts are 140 miles apart; and the eight postcode areas of the London post town cover only 40% of Greater London. The remainder of its area is covered by sections of twelve adjoining postcode areas: EN, IG, RM, DA, BR, TN, CR, SM, KT, TW, HA and UB.

United Kingdom postcode areas

Crown dependencies
The Crown dependencies (which are not part of the United Kingdom) did not introduce postcodes until later, but use a similar coding scheme. They are separate postal authorities.

Defunct postcode areas

London NE and S

Glasgow
Glasgow, like London, was divided into compass districts: C, W, NW, N, E, SE, S, SW. When postcodes were introduced, these were mapped into the new G postcode: C1 became G1, W1 became G11, N1 became G21, E1 became G31, S1 became G41, SW1 became G51, and so on. As NW and SE had never been subdivided they became G20 and G40 respectively.

Norwich and Croydon
Norwich and Croydon were used for a postcode experiment in the late 1960s, which was replaced by the current system. The format was of the form NOR or CRO followed by two numbers and a letter, e.g. NOR 07A. They were later changed to CR0 (digit '0') and NR1.

Dublin, Ireland
When Ireland was a part of the United Kingdom of Great Britain and Ireland a postal district system was introduced in 1917 by the UK government. The letter D was assigned to Dublin. Upon the establishment of the Irish Free State and later, the Republic of Ireland, the Irish government retained the designation and today it forms part of the Eircode system. Since Irish independence, D has never been reassigned as a postcode area in the UK. Modern postcodes throughout the Republic of Ireland take a slightly different form from UK postcodes and are specific to individual addresses.

Non-geographic postcodes

A number of non-geographic postcode sectors are also contained within geographic postcode areas.

GIR
GIR 0AA is a postcode created for Girobank in Bootle. It remained in use by its successors when Girobank was taken over by Alliance & Leicester and subsequently by Santander UK.

BF
The BF postcode area was introduced in 2012 to provide optional postcodes for British Forces Post Office addresses, for consistency with the layout of other UK addresses. It uses the national non-geographic post town "BFPO" and, as of 2012, the postcode district "BF1".

BX
The non-geographic postcode area BX has been introduced for addresses which do not include a locality: this allows large organisations long-term flexibility as to where they receive their mail.  This postcode area is used by Lloyds Banking Group (BX1 1LT), HSBC (BX8 0HB) and parts of the HM Revenue and Customs like VAT Central Unit (BX5 5AT) and Pay as You Earn (BX9 1AS).  Lloyds Bank also use BX4.  After splitting from Lloyds, TSB Bank uses BX4 7SB, the latter part of which, when written, looks similar to "TSB".

XX
The non-geographic postcode area XX is used by online retailers for returns by Royal Mail, and for COVID-19 test samples.

Overseas territories
Certain British Overseas Territories introduced single postal codes for their territory or major sub-sections of it. These are not UK postcodes, even though many are formatted in a similar fashion:

Other overseas territories have introduced their own more extensive postcode systems:

Civilian residential and business addresses in Akrotiri and Dhekelia are served by Cyprus Postal Services and use Cypriot postal codes.

Mail to Overseas Territories is treated as international if posted in the UK.

See also
List of postcode areas in the United Kingdom by population
List of postcode districts in the United Kingdom
Postcodes in the United Kingdom
UK Postcode Regions by Population
List of Eircode routing areas in Ireland

Notes

References

External links

Office for National Statistics - Postal geography
OpenStreetMap - Postcode map
Strowger net: postcodes of the UK
UK Business Lists - Map of UK Postcodes
Direct Marketing Lists UK postcode map 
Business Lists UK postcode map 
FREE Vector UK Postcode Maps 
PostcodeArea - Demographics, maps, crime rates, house prices and local information for all UK postcodes
Strange Maps - Frank Jacobs - Diagrammatic Map

United Kingdom
 
Areas
Postcode areas in the United Kingdom

eo:Poŝtkodoj en Britio